Lazany is a village and municipality in Prievidza District in the Trenčín Region of western Slovakia.

History
In historical records the village was first mentioned in 1430.

Geography
The municipality lies at an altitude of 316 metres and covers an area of 9.884 km². It has a population of about 1,571 people.

References

External links
 
 

Villages and municipalities in Prievidza District